Isaac Darlington (December 13, 1781 – April 27, 1839) was a member of the U.S. House of Representatives from Pennsylvania.

Biography 
He was born near West Chester, Pennsylvania and attended Friends School at Birmingham, Pennsylvania. He studied law, and was admitted to the bar in 1801 where he commenced his practice in West Chester. He was a member of the Pennsylvania House of Representatives from 1807 to 1809. He served as a lieutenant and adjutant of the Second Regiment, Pennsylvania Volunteers in 1814 and 1815.

Darlington was elected as a Federalist to the Fifteenth congress. He declined to be a candidate for renomination in 1818 to the Sixteenth congress. He was appointed deputy attorney general for Chester County, Pennsylvania in 1820 and became presiding judge of the judicial district comprising the counties of Chester and Delaware from May 1821 until the time of his death in West Chester in 1839. Interment was in the Friends Burying Ground in Birmingham, Pennsylvania. 

Darlington was the cousin of Edward Darlington and William Darlington, second cousin of Smedley Darlington. His son-in-law was Thomas S. Bell, a state senator and justice of the Supreme Court of Pennsylvania.

References

The Political Graveyard

External links 
 

1781 births
1839 deaths
People from Chester County, Pennsylvania
Federalist Party members of the United States House of Representatives from Pennsylvania
Members of the Pennsylvania House of Representatives
Pennsylvania state court judges
American militiamen in the War of 1812
Pennsylvania lawyers
19th-century American politicians
American militia officers
19th-century American judges
19th-century American lawyers
Military personnel from Pennsylvania